Maxim Birbraer (born December 15, 1980) is a Kazakhstan-born Israeli former professional ice hockey forward. Birbraer is Jewish and has played for the Israel national ice hockey team.

Playing career 

Birbraer was born in Ust-Kamenogorsk, Kazakhstan, where he lived until the age of 14, and is Jewish.   His family lived under a non-Jewish sounding surname in those years due to severe local anti-Semitism, and he was not told that he was Jewish until his parents decided to move to Israel.  Although he had played schoolboy hockey in Russia, he assumed that he would have to give up the ice when he was 14 and his family immigrated to Israel, until he discovered an indoor rink in Tel Aviv where he played in a junior league. He had lived in Israel for only 8 months when his coach, Paul Rosen, persuaded him to try out for a Canadian league with the result that he spent 2 years playing Tier 2 hockey in Ontario, where Rosen was his legal guardian.  He then joined the Ontario Provincial Junior A Hockey League.

He was the only Israeli national ever to be drafted by a NHL team when he was drafted 67th overall in the 2000 NHL Entry Draft by the New Jersey Devils. Despite this, he never played in the NHL, instead spending three seasons with their American Hockey League affiliate, the Albany River Rats. In 2006, Birbraer signed with the Cardiff Devils of the Elite Ice Hockey League, and played with the team for 7 years.  Birbraer signed with the Telford Tigers in 2014.

Career statistics

Regular season and playoffs

International

See also
List of select Jewish ice hockey players

References

External links

Max Birbraer's blog

1980 births
Albany River Rats players
Cardiff Devils players
Israeli expatriate sportspeople in Wales
Heilbronner EC players
Israeli expatriate ice hockey people
Israeli ice hockey right wingers
Israeli people of Kazakhstani-Jewish descent
Jewish ice hockey players
Jewish Israeli sportspeople
Kazakhstani emigrants to Israel
Kazakhstani Jews
Kazzinc-Torpedo players
Laredo Bucks players
Living people
Long Beach Ice Dogs (ECHL) players
New Jersey Devils draft picks
San Antonio Rampage players
San Diego Gulls (ECHL) players
Soviet Jews
Sportspeople from Oskemen
Telford Tigers players
Expatriate ice hockey players in England
Expatriate ice hockey players in Wales
Expatriate ice hockey players in the United States
Expatriate ice hockey players in Germany
Israeli expatriate sportspeople in England
Israeli expatriate sportspeople in the United States
Israeli expatriate sportspeople in Germany
Israeli expatriate sportspeople in Russia
Israeli expatriate sportspeople in Canada
Expatriate ice hockey players in Russia
Expatriate ice hockey players in Canada